The 1970 British Commonwealth Games (Scottish Gaelic: Geamannan a 'Cho-fhlaitheis Bhreatainn 1970) were held in Edinburgh, Scotland, from 16 to 25 July 1970.
This was the first time the name British Commonwealth Games was adopted, the first time metric units rather than imperial units were used in all events, and also the first time the games were held in Scotland.
Also, these games saw the first unique Games trademark logo: an emblem showing the Games emblem intertwined with a St Andrews Cross and a thistle. They were followed by the 1970 Commonwealth Paraplegic Games for wheelchair athletes.

Host selection
In August 1966, the bid vote was held in Jamaica. Edinburgh, Scotland with 18 votes beat Christchurch, New Zealand with 11.

Participating teams 

42 teams were represented at the 1970 Games.(Teams competing for the first time are shown in bold).

History 
In December of the following year, an appeal fund was launched, aiming to raise £200,000 towards the cost of running the games.

Medals by country

Medals by event

Athletics

Badminton

Bowls

Boxing

Cycling

Track

Road

Fencing

Swimming 
Men's events

Women's events

Diving

Weightlifting

Wrestling

References

External links 
 Commonwealth Games Official Site
 footage of the Opening Ceremony from Scotland on Screen archive
 A Brief History – from the Delhi 2010 site
 1970 British Commonwealth Games – Australian Commonwealth Games official website

 
British Commonwealth Games, 1970
Commonwealth Games in the United Kingdom
British Commonwealth Games
Commonwealth Games by year
British Commonwealth Games
British Commonwealth Games, 1970
British Commonwealth Games